Stockholm Half Marathon is an annual half marathon arranged in Stockholm, Sweden. It is held in the beginning of September, and so is not connected with Stockholm Marathon directly. Up until 2007 the race was called S:t Eriksloppet (S:t Erik's Race, S:t Erik is the official saint of Stockholm).  In order to attract more runners, especially foreign, the name was changed in 2007, however, in 2007 both names were used in parallel. The race has been arranged since 2001, although there was a predecessor called Stockholmsloppet (the Stockholm Race) during the years 1995-2000.

Results

Key:

References

External links
 Official Site
 Official Site (in English)

Half marathons
International athletics competitions hosted by Sweden
International sports competitions in Stockholm
1984 establishments in Sweden
September sporting events
Recurring sporting events established in 1984
Autumn events in Sweden